Henry Woollcombe (or Woolcombe; 26 March 1813 – 4 June 1885) was an Anglican clergyman who was Archdeacon of Barnstaple from 1865 until his death. A Graduate of Christ Church, Oxford, he held incumbencies at Kingsteignton and Heavitree. He was born in Broadhembury, Devon, the eldest son of Henry Woollcombe.

References

Archdeacons of Barnstaple
Clergy from Devon
Alumni of Christ Church, Oxford
1813 births
1885 deaths